Vermilion-Lloydminster was a provincial electoral district in Alberta, Canada, mandated to return a single member to the Legislative Assembly of Alberta using first past the post method of voting from 1993 to 2019.

The largest communities in the constituency are City of Lloydminster, Town of Vermilion and Town of Viking.

History
The electoral district was created in the 1993 boundary re-distribution out of the old Lloydminster and Vermilion-Viking districts.

Under the Alberta electoral boundary re-distribution of 2004, the constituency was bounded by the Saskatchewan border to the east, and clockwise from there is bounded by Battle River-Wainwright, Fort Saskatchewan-Vegreville, Lac La Biche-St. Paul and Bonnyville-Cold Lake. The district remained completely unchanged in the 2010 electoral boundary re-distribution.

The electoral district was abolished in the 2017 electoral boundary re-distribution, and redistributed into Vermilion-Lloydminster-Wainwright and Fort Saskatchewan-Vegreville electoral districts which would take effect for the 2019 Alberta general election.

Boundary history

Electoral history

The riding was created in 1993 and has been returning Progressive Conservative MLA's with large majorities since it was created. The first member was Steve West who had previously served as MLA for Vermilion-Viking for two terms beginning in 1986. While representing this riding he served a number of cabinet portfolios in the government of Ralph Klein. West retired from office in 2001.

The second representative of the riding is Lloyd Snelgrove who was first elected in 2001 and has since served three terms in office. Snelgrove briefly served as Minister of Finance under the government of Ed Stelmach. He decided to leave the Progressive Conservative caucus on January 27, 2012 and sit is an Independent after becoming disenchanted with Premier Alison Redford.

Dr. Richard Starke won the riding for the Progressive Conservatives in the 2012 election, and was one of only two PC MLAs to win re-election outside of Calgary in the 2015 election. He placed second in the PC leadership election of 2017 on a campaign of remaining an independent party from Wildrose. When the PCs subsequently voted to join the Wildrose and form the United Conservative Party, he announced he would continue to sit as a PC rather than join the new party.

Starke retired at the end of the 29th Legislature. The district was abolished at the same time, and replaced with Vermilion-Lloydminster-Wainwright.

Legislature results

1993 general election

1997 general election

2001 general election

2004 general election

2008 general election

2012 general election

2015 general election

Senate nominee results

2004 Senate nominee election district results
Voters had the option of selecting 4 Candidates on the Ballot

2012 Senate nominee election district results

Student Vote Results

2004 election

On November 19, 2004 a Student Vote was conducted at participating Alberta schools to parallel the 2004 Alberta general election results. The vote was designed to educate students and simulate the electoral process for persons who have not yet reached the legal majority. The vote was conducted in 80 of the 83 provincial electoral districts with students voting for actual election candidates. Schools with a large student body that reside in another electoral district had the option to vote for candidates outside of the electoral district then where they were physically located.

2012 election

See also
List of Alberta provincial electoral districts
Vermilion, Alberta a town in eastern Alberta
Lloydminster, Alberta a city on the border of Alberta and Saskatchewan

References

Further reading

External links
Elections Alberta
The Legislative Assembly of Alberta

Former provincial electoral districts of Alberta
Lloydminster
1993 establishments in Alberta
2019 disestablishments in Alberta
Constituencies established in 1993
Constituencies disestablished in 2019